Gaslighting is the subjective experience of having one's reality repeatedly questioned by another. A colloquialism, the term derives from the title of the 1944 American film Gaslight, which was based on the 1938 British theatre play Gas Light by Patrick Hamilton, though the term did not gain popular currency in English until the mid-2010s. A 2022 Washington Post report described it as a "trendy buzzword" that is "often used incorrectly by people referring to simple disagreements [...] that don’t meet gaslighting’s historical definition", leading to expert concerns about the term becoming diluted.

Etymology 

The term derives from the title of the 1944 American film Gaslight, a remake of the 1940 British film of the same name, which in turn is based on the 1938 thriller play Gas Light. Set among London's elite during the Victorian era, it portrays a seemingly genteel husband using lies and manipulation to isolate his heiress wife and persuade her that she is mentally unwell so that he can steal from her. The title refers to the gas lighting of the house, which seems to waver whenever the husband leaves his wife alone at home. The term "gaslighting" itself is neither in the screenplay nor mentioned in the film in any context.

The first use of the gerund form, gaslighting, was by The New York Times in a 1995 column by Maureen Dowd. According to the American Psychological Association in 2021, gaslighting "once referred to manipulation so extreme as to induce mental illness or to justify commitment of the gaslighted person to a psychiatric institution". Largely an obscure or esoteric term until gaining traction in the mid-2010s – The Times only used it nine additional times in the following twenty years – it has broadly seeped into the English lexicon since, and is now used more generally. Merriam-Webster defines it as "psychological manipulation" to make someone question their "perception of reality" leading to "dependenc[e] on the perpetrator".

The term has received a number of notable recognitions.  The American Dialect Society named gaslight as the "most useful" new word of 2016. Oxford University Press named gaslighting as a runner-up in its list of the most popular new words of 2018.

In self-help and amateur psychology 
Gaslighting is a term used in self-help and amateur psychology to describe a dynamic that can occur in personal relationships (romantic or parental) and in workplace relationships. Gaslighting involves two parties; the "gaslighter", who persistently puts forth a false narrative, and the "gaslighted", who struggles to maintain their individual autonomy. Gaslighting is typically effective only when there is an unequal power dynamic or when the gaslighted has shown respect to the gaslighter.

Gaslighting is different from genuine relationship disagreement, which is both common and important in relationships. Gaslighting is distinct in that:
 one partner is consistently listening and considering the other partner's perspective;
 one partner is consistently negating the other's perception, insisting that they are wrong, or telling them that their emotional reaction is irrational or dysfunctional.
Gaslighting typically occurs over a long duration and not on a one-off basis. Over time, the listening partner may exhibit symptoms often associated with anxiety disorders, depression, or low self-esteem. Gaslighting is distinct from genuine relationship conflict in that one party manipulates the perceptions of the other.

In psychiatry and psychology 
The word gaslighting (referring to the behavior described in the above amateur psychology section) is occasionally used in clinical literature but is considered a colloquialism by the American Psychological Association.

Since the 1970s, the term has been used in psychoanalytic literature to describe deliberate attempts by perpetrators to manipulate the victims’ perception of self, environment and relationships.

Barton and Whitehead (1969) described three case reports of gaslighting with the goal of securing a person's involuntarily commitment to a psychiatric hospital, motivated by a desire to get rid of relatives or obtain financial gain: a wife attempting to frame her husband as violent so she could elope with her lover, another wife alleging that her pub-owning husband was an alcoholic in order to leave him and take control of the pub, and a retirement home manager who gave laxatives to a resident before referring her to a psychiatric hospital for slight dementia and incontinence. In 1977, at a time when published literature on gaslighting was still "sparse", Lund and Gardiner published a case report on an elderly woman who was repeatedly involuntarily committed for alleged psychosis, by staffers of her retirement home, but whose symptoms always disappeared shortly after admittance without any treatment. After investigation, it was discovered that her 'paranoia' had been the result of gaslighting by staffers of the retirement home, who knew the woman had suffered from paranoid psychosis fifteen years prior. The research paper, "Gaslighting: A Marital Syndrome" (1988), includes clinical observations of the impact on wives after their reactions were mislabeled by their husbands and male therapists.  Other experts have noted values and techniques of therapists can be harmful as well as helpful to clients (or indirectly to other people in a client's life).

In his 1996 book, Gaslighting, the Double Whammy, Interrogation and Other Methods of Covert Control in Psychotherapy and Analysis, Theo L. Dorpat, M.D. recommends non-directive and egalitarian attitudes and methods on the part of clinicians, and "treating patients as active collaborators and equal partners". He writes, "Therapists may contribute to the victim's distress through mislabeling the [victim's] reactions. [...] The gaslighting behaviors of the spouse provide a recipe for the so-called 'nervous breakdown' for some [victims, and] suicide in some of the worst situations." Dorpat also cautions clinicians about the unintentional abuse of patients when using interrogation and other methods of covert control in Psychotherapy and Analysis, as these methods can subtly coerce patients rather than respect and genuinely help them.

This increased global awareness of the dangers of gaslighting does not inspire all psychologists, and some of them have issued warnings that overuse of the term could weaken its meaning and minimize the serious health effects of such abuse.

Motivations
Gaslighting is a way to control the moment, stop conflict, ease anxiety, and feel in control. However, it often deflects responsibility and tears down the other person. Some may gaslight their partners by denying events, including personal violence.

Learned behavior
Gaslighting is a learned trait. A gaslighter is a student of social learning. They witness it, experience it themselves, or stumble upon it, and see that it works, both for self-regulation and coregulation. Studies have shown that gaslighting is more prevalent in couples where one or both partners have maladaptive personality traits such as traits associated with short-term mental illness (e.g., depression), substance induced illness (e.g., alcoholism), mood disorders (e.g., bipolar), anxiety disorders (e.g., PTSD), personality disorder (e.g., BPD, NPD, etc.), neurodevelopmental disorder (e.g., ADHD), or combination of the above (i.e., comorbidity) and are prone to and adept at convincing others to doubt their own perceptions.

Habilitation
It can be difficult to extricate oneself from a gaslighting power dynamic:
 Those who gaslight must attain greater emotional awareness and self-regulation, or;
 Those being gaslighted must learn that they don't need others to validate their reality and they need to gain self-reliance and confidence in defining their own reality.

In medicine 
"Medical gaslighting" is an informal term that refers to patients having their real symptoms dismissed or downplayed by medical professionals, leading to incorrect diagnoses. Women and racial minorities are more likely to be affected by the phenomenon.

In politics 
Gaslighting is more likely to be effective when the gaslighter has a position of power.

In the 2008 book State of Confusion: Political Manipulation and the Assault on the American Mind, the authors contend that the prevalence of gaslighting in American politics began with the age of modern communications:

The term has been used to describe the behavior of politicians and media personalities on both the left and the right sides of the political spectrum. Some examples include:

 "Gaslighting" has been used to describe Russia's global relations. While Russian operatives were active in Crimea in 2017, Russian officials continually denied their presence and manipulated the distrust of political groups in their favor.
 American journalists widely used the word "gaslighting" to describe the actions of Donald Trump during the 2016 US presidential election and his term as president.
 Columnist Maureen Dowd described the Bill Clinton administration's use of the technique in subjecting Newt Gingrich to small indignities intended to provoke him to make public complaints that "came across as hysterical" in 1995.
 "Gaslighting" has been used to describe state implemented psychological harassment techniques used in East Germany during the 1970s and 80s. The techniques were used as part of the Stasi's (the state security service's) decomposition methods, which were designed to paralyze the ability of hostile-negative (politically incorrect or rebellious) people to operate without unjustifiably imprisoning them, which would have resulted in international condemnation.

Broader use 
The word "gaslighting" is often used incorrectly to refer generally to conflicts and disagreements. According to Robin Stern, PhD, co-founder of the Yale Center for Emotional Intelligence, "Gaslighting is often used in an accusatory way when somebody may just be insistent on something, or somebody may be trying to influence you. That’s not what gaslighting is."

Some mental health experts have expressed concern that the broader use of the term is diluting its usefulness and may make it more difficult to identify the specific type of abuse described in the original definition.

In popular culture 

One of the earliest uses of the term in television was in a 1974 episode of The Six Million Dollar Man. In the second-season episode, "The Seven Million Dollar Man", Steve Austin accuses Oscar Goldman, Rudy Wells and nurse Carla Peterson of gaslighting him after all three try to convince him that an incident he saw did not happen.  
 
In 1994, the character Roz Doyle uses the phrase in "Fortysomething", an episode of the American television sitcom Frasier.

In a 2000 interview, the writers of the song "Gaslighting Abbie" (Steely Dan album Two Against Nature) explain that the lyrics were inspired by a term they heard in New York City, "gaslighting", which they believed was derived from the 1944 film Gaslight. "It is about a certain kind of mind [manipulation] or messing with somebody’s head".

During the period 2014–2016, BBC Radio 4's soap opera The Archers aired a two-year long storyline about Helen who was subjected to slow-burning coercive control by her bullying, manipulative husband, Rob. The show shocked the United Kingdom, sparking a national discussion about domestic abuse.

In the 2016 film The Girl on the Train, Rachel suffered from severe depression and alcoholism. The storyline evolved around Rachel's blackouts as her husband consistently tells her that she had done terrible things that she didn't actually do.

In 2017, the phrase was used to describe Harvey Weinstein's extraordinary measures (see ) to gaslight the women he sexually preyed upon, the journalists investigating their stories, and the public.

In 2018, NBC's soap opera Days of Our Lives had a months-long storyline about retaliation and Gabi's systematic efforts to have her best friend Abigail committed into a mental health care facility. In the end, Gabi gleefully confessed to Abigail what she had done to her and why.

In 2019, CNN's nightly news commentary, Anderson Cooper 360°, aired 24 episodes about the lies being told by politicians in the news. The segments were named "Keeping Them Honest: We'll Leave The Gaslight On For You, Part __".

In 2020, country music group The Chicks released a song titled "Gaslighter" about a manipulative husband.

In 2022, Merriam-Webster named "gaslighting" as its Word of the Year due to the vast increase in channels and technologies used to mislead and the word becoming common for the perception of deception.

See also

References 

Deception
Politics
Psychological abuse
Psychological manipulation
Psychotherapy